Robert Henry Burnside (May 20, 1933 – August 2, 2021) was an American politician in the state of South Carolina. He served in the South Carolina House of Representatives as a member of the Democratic Party from 1971 to 1978, representing Richland County, South Carolina. He was a lawyer.

References

1933 births
2021 deaths
Democratic Party members of the South Carolina House of Representatives
South Carolina lawyers
Politicians from Columbia, South Carolina
Lawyers from Columbia, South Carolina